The women's heptathlon event at the 1986 World Junior Championships in Athletics was held in Athens, Greece, at Olympic Stadium on 18 and 19 July.

Medalists

Results

Final
18/19 July

Participation
According to an unofficial count, 18 athletes from 12 countries participated in the event.

References

Heptathlon
Combined events at the World Athletics U20 Championships